Victoria Gardens is a  lifestyle center in Rancho Cucamonga, California, designed to be the downtown center for the City of Rancho Cucamonga.

Components and events
The complex comprises not only department stores, shops, restaurants, and movie theaters, but also a performing arts center, a library,  of office space, and 500 residential units. 

Retail anchors are JCPenney, Macy's Men's, Children's, and Home store, a separate Macy's store with the remaining departments, and Bass Pro Shops.

The Victoria Gardens Cultural Center, which features the Rancho Cucamonga Public Library, a performing arts center, and a multi-use reception hall, is owned and operated by the city of Rancho Cucamonga and sits north of the shopping center between the two parking structures.

There are events throughout the year such as the tree lighting and Santa during the holiday season, farmer’s markets, and car shows. Victoria Gardens is the home of the first Bass Pro Shops location in California.

History
The mall opened on October 28, 2004, with JCPenney, Macy's, and Robinsons-May (now the Macy's Men's, Children's, and Home store) as the anchors.

The mall increased the city's sales tax income by 44% in its first year of operation. 

In 2006, the former Robinsons-May store was converted to a Macy's Men's and Home Store to complement the existing Macy's. 

Victoria Gardens is owned by Queensland Investment Corp.

References

External links

Victoria Gardens Official Site
Victoria Gardens Cultural Center
 

Shopping malls in San Bernardino County, California
Shopping malls established in 2004